The men's 4 × 110 yards relay event at the 1954 British Empire and Commonwealth Games was held on 7 July at the Empire Stadium in Vancouver, Canada.

Medalists

Results

Heats

Qualification: First 3 teams of each heat (Q) qualified directly for the final.

Final

References

Athletics at the 1954 British Empire and Commonwealth Games
1954